Volodymyr Dmytrovych Talashko  is a Soviet and Ukrainian actor. Organizer Leonid Bykov Foundation. People's Artist of Ukraine (2002).

Biography 
Vladimir  Talashko was born March 6, 1946, in the village of Hrabovo Volyn region, in miner's family. In the Donetsk National Academic Ukrainian Musical and Drama Theatre the future actor was literally off the street, not having special education. At the competition of amateur performances in Moscow, during one of the concerts of the young man, I remarked the director of the theater. The parents were against it, considering the profession of actor frivolous. Nevertheless, from 1963 to 1965 he worked as an actor in the Donetsk theater.

After serving military service in the Soviet army, he went to Kyiv to act in theater school. In 1972, Vladimir Talashko graduated from the Kyiv National I. K. Karpenko-Kary Theatre, Cinema and Television University.

Since 1972, an actor Dovzhenko Film Studios.

In August 2021, he found himself at the center of a scandal after receiving simultaneous accusations of harassment from several women. On August 8, 2021, theater critic and screenwriter Bohdan Pankrukhin published a post on Facebook with the stories of two specific girls. Later, similar accusations were made by other young women. The actor was accused by his students and former students, as well as by a journalist who alleged harassment during an interview. Minister of Culture and Information Policy Oleksandr Tkachenko said in his commentary that an internal investigation had been launched, and the university's vice-rector for research Halyna Mylenka said that the teacher had been suspended from teaching.

Volodymyr Talashko denies all the accusations: "This is a fake, a release of energy from people who want something. Nothing of the kind happened, nothing of the kind that is being said". Later, Volodymyr Talashko wrote a letter of resignation and stopped teaching at the university. His case became a precedent for an official investigation of harassment in a creative university with a successful resolution.

Selected filmography
 Only Old Men Are Going to Battle (1973) as  Skvortsov
 Captain Nemo (1975) as Ned Land
 The Fairfax Millions (1980) as Malcolm Treddic
 The Ballad of the Valiant Knight Ivanhoe (1983) as Messenger
 The Witches Cave (1991) as Aksel, ethnographer

References

External links

1946 births
Living people
Soviet male film actors
Soviet male stage actors
20th-century Ukrainian male actors
21st-century Ukrainian male actors
Ukrainian male film actors
Ukrainian male stage actors
Kyiv National I. K. Karpenko-Kary Theatre, Cinema and Television University alumni
Recipients of the title of People's Artists of Ukraine